QuickField is a finite element analysis software package running on Windows platforms. It is developed by the Danish company Tera Analysis Ltd. in cooperation with Russian firm Tor Ltd.  QuickField is available as a commercial program or as a free Student Edition with limited functionality. Main applications include computer simulations of electromagnetic fields   for scientific and industrial purposes, and use as a teaching aid in the college and university electromagnetic or physics courses.

Analysis types 

 AC, DC and transient electromagnetics
 Electrostatics, DC, AC and transient electric analysis
 Steady-state and transient heat transfer
 Stress analysis
 Coupled multiphysics

References

External links 
 Main QuickField Support site
 Tera Analysis Ltd. home page
 QuickField User's Guide
 German QuickField Support site
 French QuickField Support site
 Spanish QuickField Support site
 Tor Ltd. home page

Finite element software